Ron Blake (born September 7, 1965) is an American saxophonist, band leader, composer, and music educator. Born in the Virgin Islands, he attended Northwestern University, and now lives in New York City. Blake began studying guitar at 8 and turned to the saxophone at 10. He taught at the University of South Florida before moving to New York, where he spent five years in trumpeter Roy Hargrove's quintet, and seven years in flugelhornist Art Farmer's group. He attended the Interlochen Arts Academy. He completed a master's degree at NYU in 2010. Blake co-founded the 21st Century Band and the Tahmun record label with Dion Parson in 1998. He is a member of NBC's Saturday Night Live Band, and the Grammy award-winning Christian McBride Big Band. He is a professor of Jazz Studies at The Juilliard School. He has more than sixty credits on his discography as a sideman and continues to work as a performer.

As leader

 Up Front and Personal (Tahmun, 2000)
 Lest We Forget (Mack Avenue, 2003)
 Sonic Tonic (Mack Avenue, 2005)
 Shayari (Mack Avenue, 2008)

As co-leader

 4-Sight (Encoded Music, 1998)
 21st Century (Tahmun, 2000)

As sideman or featured artist

With Bobby Broom
 Waitin' and Waitin (Criss Cross, 1996)With David Byrne and St. Vincent Love This Giant (4AD, 2012) With Marc Cary Cary On (Enja, 1995)
 Listen (Arabesque, 1997)
 The Antidote (Arabesque, 1998)With Joey DeFrancesco Organic Vibes (Concord, 2006)With Cucu Diamantes Cuculand (Fun Machine, 2009)With Denise Donatelli When Lights Are Low (Savant, 2010)With Kat Edmonson Way Down Low (Spinnerette, 2012)With Art Farmer The Company I Keep (Arabesque, 1994) with Tom Harrell
 The Meaning of Art (Arabesque, 1995)
 Silk Road (Arabesque, 1997)With Tia Fuller Healing Space (Mack Avenue, 2007)With Tobias Gebb & Unit 7 Free At Last (Yummyhouse, 2009)With Benny GolsonRemembering Clifford (Milestone, 1998)
 Brown Immortal (Keystone, 2005)With Benito Gonzalez Circles (Furthermore, 2010)With Roy Hargrove Of Kindred Souls (Novus, 1993)
 With the Tenors of Our Time (Verve, 1994)
 Approaching Standards (Novus, 1994)
 Family (Verve, 1995)With Morgan James Hunter (Epic, 2014)With Sean Jones Gemini (Mack Avenue, 2005)With Cornelius Claudio Kreusch & Black Mud Sound Scoop (Act Music + Vision, 1998)With Steve Kroon Señor Kroon (Pony Canyon, 2002)With Oliver Lake Big Band Cloth (Passin' Thru, 2001)With Axel Tosca Laugart Axel Tosca Laugart (Alfi, 2016)With Ric Mandell A Road Less Traveled (HandGame, 2002)With Armin Marmalejo Boarding Pass (Igmod, 1997)With Christian McBride Sci-Fi (Verve, 2002)
 Vertical Vision (Warner Bros., 2003)
 Live at Tonic (Ropeadope, 2006)
 Conversations with Christian (Mack Avenue, 2011)
 The Good Feeling (Mack Avenue, 2012)
 Bringin' It (Mack Avenue, 2017)With Jorge Moreno Moreno (WEA International, 2001)With Meshell Ndegeocello The Spirit Music Jamia: Dance of the Infidel (Shenachie, 2005)With Nicole Viaje Infinito (Maverick, 2001)With Organissimo Waiting for the Boogaloo Sisters (Big O, 2003)With Dion Parson and 21st Century Band People Music (Tahmun, 2006)
 Live at Dizzy's Club Coca-Cola, Vol. 1 (Dion Parsons Records, 2010)
 Live at Dizzy's Club Coca Cola, Vol. 2 (Jazzheads, 2013)
 St. Thomas (Dion Parsons Records, 2015)With Clarence Penn Penn's Landing (Criss Cross, 1996)
 Play-Penn (Criss Cross, 2001)With Katy Perry Prism (Capitol, 2013)With Tony Reedus Minor Thang (Criss Cross, 1995)With Diane Reeves Quiet After the Storm (Blue Note, 1995)With Justin Robinson The Challenge (Arabesque, 1998)With Reuben Rogers The Things I Am (Renwick, 2006)With Matthew Rybecki Driven (Accession, 2011)With Stephen Scott The Beautiful Thing (Verve, 1996)With Terell Stafford Centripetal Force (Candid, 1997)With Mary Stallings Live at the Village Vanguard (MAXJAZZ, 2001)With Sunny Sumter Rite of Passage (Jordan, 2001)With Jimmy Smith Damn! (Verve, 1996)With Teraesa Vinson Opportunity Please Knock (Amplified Music, 2004)With Rodney Whitaker Ballads And Blues - The Brooklyn Session (Criss Cross, 1998)
 Hidden Kingdom (DIW, 1998)
 Winter Moon (Sirocco Jazz, 2004)With Pharez Whitted Mysterious Cargo (Motown, 1996)With Vanessa Williams Sweetest Days (PolyGram, 1994)With Gerald WilsonIn My Time (Mack Avenue, 2005)
Monterey Moods (Mack Avenue, 2007)
Detroit (Mack Avenue, 2009)
Legacy (Mack Avenue, 2011)With Anthony Wonsey Open The Gates (Criss Cross, 1998)With Yerba Buena!'''
 President Alien (Razor & Tie, 2003)
 Island Life'' (Razor & Tie, 2005)

References

1965 births
Living people
Musicians from San Juan, Puerto Rico
Mainstream jazz musicians
Hard bop musicians
Post-bop saxophonists
American jazz saxophonists
American male saxophonists
Saturday Night Live Band members
21st-century American saxophonists
21st-century American male musicians
American male jazz musicians
Christian McBride Big Band members
Mack Avenue Records artists